Diego Alan Mercado Carrizo (born 3 January 1997) is an Argentine professional footballer who plays as a midfielder for Huracán.

Career
Mercado began his senior career with Independiente, having joined their youth system from Boca Juniors. He was an unused substitute on two occasions during the 2017–18 Argentine Primera División season under manager Ariel Holan, prior to making his professional debut in the following campaign against Huracán on 21 October 2018; Holan subbed him on for the final seconds of a 3–1 victory.

Career statistics
.

References

External links

1997 births
Living people
Sportspeople from Buenos Aires Province
Argentine footballers
Association football midfielders
Argentine Primera División players
Club Atlético Independiente footballers
Club Atlético Huracán footballers